This table is a reference tool for rapidly locating Wikipedia articles on Historic and Prehistoric climate indicators of all types.

To Add:
 
 Alkenone analysis
 TEX-86 analysis
 Nile river flood levels
 Trace mineral ratios in deltaic sediment
 Wildlife distribution
 Pollen analysis
 Historic storm-related sinkings
 Sea temperature and atmospheric pressure (ENSO)
 Scientific meteorological measurements (since 1800s)
 air temperature
 air pressure
 wind speed and direction
 Ocean currents and marine productivity
 Flooding and drought observations on land
 Volcanic activity
 Elevated charcoal in lake sediments
 Sand dune activation records
 Eolian (wind-borne) sediment deposition

See also 
 
 Geologic time scale
 Glacial period
 Ice age
 Last Glacial Period

References

Science-related lists
Paleoclimatology